Sander Oostlander (born 25 November 1984 in Heerjansdam) is a former Dutch cyclist.

Major results
Source:
2007
 1st Rund um den Elm
 1st  Overall Grand Prix Cycliste de Gemenc
1st Stage 1
2008
 2nd Overall Tour of Romania
1st Prologue
 3rd Kernen Omloop Echt-Susteren

References

External links

1984 births
Living people
Dutch male cyclists
People from Heerjansdam
Sportspeople from Zwijndrecht, Netherlands
Cyclists from South Holland
20th-century Dutch people
21st-century Dutch people